Mel Carter (born April 22, 1939, Cincinnati, Ohio) is an American singer and actor. He is best known for his 1965 million-selling recording, "Hold Me, Thrill Me, Kiss Me".

Biography
At age 16 Carter studied singing with vocalist Little Jimmy Scott.  Carter recorded for Sam Cooke's SAR (Derby Records) in the early 1960s and had his first hit in 1963 at the age of 24 with "When a Boy Falls in Love", which was co-written by Cooke.

By the time he reached his commercial peak with Imperial Records in the middle of the decade, he was specializing in pop ballads. His biggest success was the Top 10 Billboard Hot 100 hit "Hold Me, Thrill Me, Kiss Me," which reached Number 8 in 1965. It sold over one million copies, and was awarded a gold disc.  He had a couple of other Top 40 entries over the next year, "Band of Gold" and "All of a Sudden My Heart Sings", as well as a few other easy listening sellers.

Carter appeared on the DVD of the PBS special, Doo Wop 51, recorded in 2001 performing his hit; he also appeared on another PBS special, Magic Moments: The Best of 50s Pop, performing a tribute to Billy Williams ("I'm Gonna Sit Right Down and Write Myself a Letter") and Tommy Edwards ("It's All in the Game").

Carter later acted on television programs such as Quincy, M.E.; Sanford and Son; Marcus Welby, M.D.; The Eddie Capra Mysteries; CHiPs; and Magnum, P.I.; and in films such as Friday Foster (1975); Chesty Anderson, USN (1976); American Raspberry (1977); and Angel (1984).

Singles 

 A"When a Boy Falls In Love" also peaked at #30 on R&B charts.

References

External links

Mel Carter's Website
[ article by Richie Unterberger]

20th-century African-American male singers
American soul musicians
American pop musicians
Arwin Records artists
Imperial Records artists
Bell Records artists
Musicians from Cincinnati
1939 births
Living people
Singers from Ohio